For the 1988–89 season, Carlisle United F.C. competed in Football League Division Four.

Results & fixtures

Football League Fourth Division

Football League Cup

FA Cup

Football League Trophy

References

 11v11

Carlisle United F.C. seasons